Ulf Hoffmann (born 8 September 1961) is a retired German gymnast. He missed the 1984 Summer Olympics due to their boycott by East Germany and took part in the Friendship Games instead, winning a silver medal in the team competition. He won another silver medal with the East German team at the 1988 Summer Olympics. His best individual result at those Games was 13th place on parallel bars. He won three bronze medal at the world championships in 1985 and 1987 (team) and European championships in 1985 (parallel bars). After retiring he moved to Basel, Switzerland where he coaches female gymnasts. 

His elder brother Lutz was an Olympic gymnast.

References

1961 births
Living people
People from Neustrelitz
People from Bezirk Neubrandenburg
German male artistic gymnasts
Sportspeople from Mecklenburg-Western Pomerania
Olympic gymnasts of East Germany
Gymnasts at the 1988 Summer Olympics
Olympic silver medalists for East Germany
Olympic medalists in gymnastics
Medalists at the 1988 Summer Olympics
Medalists at the World Artistic Gymnastics Championships
Recipients of the Patriotic Order of Merit in silver